Ullesthorpe Mill (also known as Ullesthorpe Subscription Windmill) is a disused tower mill, built in 1800 at Ullesthorpe, Leicestershire.

Members of the Ullesthorpe Preservation Trust have applied for a Heritage Lottery Fund grant to have the mill restored and turned into a small museum and local heritage centre.

External links

Ullesthorpe Windmill
Ullesthorpe.org.uk » Ullesthorpe Village Website

Windmills in Leicestershire
Grade II listed buildings in Leicestershire
Tower mills in the United Kingdom
Grinding mills in the United Kingdom
Windmills completed in 1800